Galpharm International Ltd, trades as Galpharm Healthcare, is UK's biggest supplier of non-prescription medicine. The company is based in Dodworth, Barnsley, England and sponsored the Galpharm Stadium in nearby Huddersfield.

History
The company was founded in 1982 by Graham Leslie. In January 2008, the company was acquired by The Perrigo Group for $86 million.

From August 2004 until July 2012, the Huddersfield Town football stadium also home to the Huddersfield Giants Rugby League club (opened in 1994 as the Alfred McAlpine Stadium) has been known as the Galpharm Stadium as part of a sponsorship deal. The stadium has since been renamed John Smith's Stadium following the naming rights being purchased by Heineken.

References

External links
SunazMart Website
McDaid Pharmacy Website

Pharmaceutical companies of the United Kingdom
Companies based in Barnsley
Pharmaceutical companies established in 1982
1982 establishments in the United Kingdom